Elixia is a genus of crustose lichens in the family Elixiaceae. It has two species:

Elixia cretica 
Elixia flexella 

The genus was circumscribed in 1997 by H. Thorsten Lumbsch. The genus name honours Australian lichenologist John Alan Elix.

References

Lecanoromycetes
Lecanoromycetes genera
Lichen genera
Taxa described in 1997
Taxa named by Helge Thorsten Lumbsch